Leonhardt is a surname. Notable people with the surname include:
 Andreas Leonhardt (1800–1866), Austrian musician
 Brett Leonhardt (born 1982), Canadian ice hockey goaltender
 Brian Leonhardt (born 1990), American football tight end
 Carolin Leonhardt (born 1984), German sprint canoer
 Chad Leonhardt (born 1980), American mixed martial artist
 David Leonhardt (born 1973), American business journalist, and Pulitzer Prize winner with the New York Times
 Elizabeth Leonhardt (1867–1953), American naval nurse, one of the Sacred Twenty
 Ernst Leonhardt (1885–1945), American-born Swiss Nazi politician
 Fritz Leonhardt (1909–1999), German civil engineer
 Gustav Leonhardt (1928–2012), Dutch musician
 Herbert Leonhardt (1925–1986), German skier
 Holm Arno Leonhardt (born 1952), German scientist
 Jessica Leonhardt, better known as Jessi Slaughter, cyberbullying victim
 Jürgen Leonhardt (born 1957), German classical philologist
 Kent Leonhardt (born 1954), American politician
 Olive Leonhardt (1895–1963), American illustrator
 Olivier Léonhardt (1964–2022), French politician
 Paige Leonhardt (born 2000), Australian swimmer
 Paul Saladin Leonhardt, (1877–1934), German chess master
 Ralph Leonhardt (born 1967), German skier
 Robert Leonhardt (1877–1923), Austria-born baritone
 Sven Leonhardt (born 1968), German skier
 Ulf Leonhardt (born 1965), German-British scientist
 Yenz Leonhardt (born 1961), Danish heavy metal musician

See also 
 Leonard (disambiguation)
 Leonhard (disambiguation)
 Leonhart